Jamila Ahmad is a Pakistani politician who had been a Member of the National Assembly of Pakistan from 2002 to 2007.

Political career
Ahmad was indirectly elected to the National Assembly of Pakistan as a candidate of Muttahida Majlis-e-Amal on reserved seat for women in 2002 Pakistani general election.

She reportedly resigned in October 2007.

References

Living people
People from Swat District
Pakistani MNAs 2002–2007
Women members of the National Assembly of Pakistan
Year of birth missing (living people)
21st-century Pakistani women politicians